Kálfafell is a hamlet in south east Iceland, near the Vatnajökull glacier.  It is in the municipality of Hornafjörður.

Populated places in Southern Region (Iceland)